The 1964 Tour de Hongrie was the 20th edition of the Tour de Hongrie cycle race and was held from 15 to 21 June 1964. The race started in Budapest and finished in Szombathely. The race was won by Ferenc Stámusz.

General classification

References

1964
Tour de Hongrie
Tour de Hongrie